The 1996 Syracuse Orangemen football team competed in football on behalf of Syracuse University during the 1996 NCAA Division I-A football season. The Orangemen were coached by Paul Pasqualoni and played their home games at the Carrier Dome in Syracuse, New York.

Schedule

Schedule Source:

Roster

References

Syracuse
Syracuse Orange football seasons
Liberty Bowl champion seasons
Syracuse Orangemen football